OpenSolaris for System z is a discontinued port of the OpenSolaris operating system to the IBM System z line of mainframe computers.

History 
OpenSolaris is based on Solaris, which was originally released by Sun Microsystems in 1991. Sun released the bulk of the Solaris system source code in OpenSolaris on 14 June 2005, which made it possible for developers to create other OpenSolaris distributions. Sine Nomine Associates began a project to bring OpenSolaris to the IBM mainframe in July, 2006. The project was named Sirius (in analogy to the Polaris project to port OpenSolaris to PowerPC). In April, 2007, Sine Nomine presented an initial progress report at IBM's System z Technical Expo conference.

At the Gartner Data Center Conference in Las Vegas, Nevada in late 2007, Sine Nomine demonstrated OpenSolaris running on IBM System z under z/VM.  It was there that David Boyes of Sine Nomine stated that OpenSolaris for System z would be available "soon."

At the SHARE conference on 13 August 2008, Neale Ferguson of Sine Nomine Associates presented an update on the progress of OpenSolaris for System z.  This presentation included a working demonstration of OpenSolaris for System z.  During this presentation he stated that while OpenSolaris is "not ready for prime-time" they hoped to have a version available to the public for testing "in a matter of weeks rather than months."

In October, 2008, Sine Nomine Associates released the first "prototype" (it lacks a number of features such as DTrace, Solaris Containers and the ability to act as an NFS server) of OpenSolaris for System z to the public.  OpenSolaris for System z has a project page at OpenSolaris.org. OpenSolaris for System z is  available for download at no charge, and is governed by the same open source license terms as OpenSolaris for other platforms. All source code is available; there are no OCO (object code only) modules.

The port uses z/Architecture 64-bit addressing and therefore requires an IBM System z mainframe. Because the port depends on recently defined z/Architecture processor instructions, it requires a System z9 or later mainframe model and will not run on older machines. It also will not run on the release version of Hercules mainframe emulator, the needed changes are included in the SVN version 5470 of Hercules. It also requires the paravirtualization features provided by z/VM; it will not run on "bare metal" or in a logical partition (LPAR) without the z/VM hypervisor at Version 5.3 level or later. Also, because OpenSolaris uses a new network DIAGNOSE instruction, PTF VM64466 or VM64471 must be applied to z/VM to provide support for that instruction.  On 18 November 2008, IBM authorized the use of IFL processors to run OpenSolaris for System z workloads.

The Register reported in March 2010 an email from an insider saying that:

See also 
 Linux on IBM Z
 UTS (Mainframe UNIX)

References

External links 
 OpenSolaris Project: System z (source code and project home)
 Sine Nomine Associates
 OpenSolaris for System z Distribution (binary code download site)

OpenSolaris
IBM mainframe operating systems
VM (operating system)